Below are lists of films produced in Egypt in the 1940s.

List of Egyptian films of 1940
List of Egyptian films of 1941
List of Egyptian films of 1942
List of Egyptian films of 1943
List of Egyptian films of 1944
List of Egyptian films of 1945
List of Egyptian films of 1946
List of Egyptian films of 1947
List of Egyptian films of 1948
List of Egyptian films of 1949

External links 
 Egyptian films at the Internet Movie Database

1940s
Egypt